Hicklin School is a historic one-room school located near Lexington, Lafayette County, Missouri.  It was designed by J.H. Felt & Co. and built in 1914.  It is a standardized plan, cross-gabled frame building. Also on the property is a contributing two-hole privy. The school closed about 1957.

It was listed on the National Register of Historic Places in 2004.

References

One-room schoolhouses in Missouri
School buildings on the National Register of Historic Places in Missouri
School buildings completed in 1914
Schools in Lafayette County, Missouri
National Register of Historic Places in Lafayette County, Missouri
1914 establishments in Missouri